Lützelflüh-Goldbach is a Swiss twin suburb located about 36 km driving distance from Bern and 9 km from Burgdorf, Switzerland.

References

Geography of the canton of Bern